Bob Wilmot (born: 20 June 1958) is a sailor from Sydney, Australia, who represented his country at the 1988 Summer Olympics in Busan, South Korea as helmsman in the Soling. With crew members Glenn Read and Matthew Percy they took the 14th place.

References

Living people
1962 births
Sailors at the 1988 Summer Olympics – Soling
Olympic sailors of Australia
Australian male sailors (sport)